The 2020 Ohio Bobcats football team represented Ohio University in the 2020 NCAA Division I FBS football season. They were led by 16th-year head coach Frank Solich and played their home games at Peden Stadium in Athens, Ohio, as members of the East Division of the Mid-American Conference.  This was Solich's final year as the head coach at Ohio.  Ohio didn't play in a bowl for the first time since 2014 as the MAC only allowed its division winners to play but they were bowl eligible for the 12th straight year.

Schedule
Ohio had a game scheduled against North Carolina Central, which was canceled due to the COVID-19 pandemic. as most of the FCS season was played in the spring.  The MAC was among the last FBS conferences to start football in the fall due to the pandemic with the intention of playing just 6 conference games. Ohio had conference games with Miami, Buffalo, and Kent State cancelled due to positive COVID-19 tests.

References

Ohio
Ohio Bobcats football seasons
Ohio Bobcats football